The CJ International House is a C-shaped dormitory for foreign professors and students at Korea University in Seoul, South Korea.

The building is organized into a residence hall and a conference hall. The Residence hall is equipped with study rooms, lounges, kitchens, and a fitness center. It is situated at the top of a very large hill, and has a good view of the city of Seoul.

See also 
Korea University

References

External links 

Korea University
Buildings and structures in Seoul